General John Nelson Abrams (September 3, 1946 – August 20, 2018) was a United States Army four-star general who commanded the United States Army Training and Doctrine Command from 1998 to 2002.

Early life and career
Abrams was born at Fort Knox, Kentucky, on September 3, 1946, the son of General Creighton Abrams and Julia (Harvey) Abrams. He graduated from Frankfurt American High School in 1964, and attended Bowling Green University before deciding to enlist in the United States Army.

Abrams enlisted in the United States Army on January 16, 1966, and after completion of his initial training he attended Officer Candidate School.  He graduated on February 3, 1967, with a commission as a second lieutenant of Armor.  Abrams was assigned to 2nd Squadron, 1st Cavalry Regiment at Fort Hood during its training prior to deploying to Vietnam. His Vietnam War combat assignments with the squadron from 1967 to 1969 included platoon leader for B Troop, executive officer for A Troop, commander of A Troop, commander of C Troop, and commander of the squadron's Provisional Rifle Company.

Education
Abrams received his Bachelor of Science degree in business administration from Bowling Green University in 1972. He received a Master of Science degree in public administration from Shippensburg University in 1986 as part of his completion of the Army War College. In 2002, he received the honorary degree of Doctor of Philosophy in Military Education and Training from Norwich University.

Continued career
Abrams' post-Vietnam assignments included  instructor in Military Science at the United States Military Academy beginning in 1972. In 1976, he graduated from the United States Army Command and General Staff College at Fort Leavenworth.  He commanded 1st Squadron, 11th Armored Cavalry Regiment from 1983 to 1985. Abrams graduated from the United States Army War College in 1986, and then served as assistant chief staff for plans and operations G-3 for the 3rd Armored Division, followed by promotion to colonel and assignment as division chief staff from 1986 to 1988. From 1988 to 1990, Abrams commanded the 11th Armored Cavalry Regiment.  From 1990 to 1991 he was deputy director for operations, readiness and modernization in the Army's Office of the Deputy Chief Staff for Operations and Plans.

General officer
After promotion to brigadier general, Abrams served as assistant division commander for the 1st Cavalry Division from 1991 to 1993. From 1993 to 1995, he was commander of the 2nd Infantry Division as a major general. Abrams was promoted to lieutenant general in 1995 and assigned as commander of V Corps, which included participation in Operation Joint Endeavor.

He was deputy commander of the Army's Training and Doctrine Command from 1997 to 1998, and received promotion to general and assignment as TRADOC's commander in 1998. He  served until retiring in 2002.

Awards and decorations
Abrams' awards and decorations included:

Post military
After retiring, Abrams became a military analyst for the Associated Press. He was the president and chief executive officer of John Abrams Learning & Information Systems, Inc., a consulting and technology firm.

Abrams died at Walter Reed National Military Medical Center in Bethesda, Maryland, on August 20, 2018. He was buried at Arlington National Cemetery.

Family
Abrams was the son of Julia Berthe Harvey (1915–2003) and General Creighton W. Abrams Jr. His brothers Creighton III and Robert were also army general officers.

He married Cecilia Bosico in 1969.  They were the parents of two daughters, Noël, the wife of Nathan Naylor, and Elizabeth, the wife of Chris Bauernshub.

Images gallery

References

1946 births
2018 deaths
People from Cumberland, Maine
Military personnel from Maine
United States Army generals
United States Army personnel of the Vietnam War
Recipients of the Distinguished Service Medal (US Army)
Recipients of the Silver Star
Recipients of the Legion of Merit
Recipients of the Air Medal
Bowling Green State University alumni
Shippensburg University of Pennsylvania alumni
Norwich University alumni
United States Army Command and General Staff College alumni
United States Army War College alumni
Knights Commander of the Order of Merit of the Federal Republic of Germany